Union Glacier, is a large, heavily crevassed glacier which receives the flow of several tributaries and drains through the middle of the Heritage Range, Ellsworth Mountains, Antarctica. The glacier drains from the plateau at Edson Hills on the west side of the range and flows east between Pioneer Heights and Enterprise Hills. Union Glacier was mapped by U.S. Geological Survey (USGS) from surveys and U.S. Navy (USN) air photos, 1961–66. The name was applied by Advisory Committee on Antarctic Names (US-ACAN) in association with the name Heritage Range.

The glacier is the site of Union Glacier Blue-Ice Runway and Union Glacier Camp.

Maps
 Union Glacier. Scale 1:250 000 topographic map. Reston, Virginia: US Geological Survey, 1966.
 Antarctic Digital Database (ADD). Scale 1:250000 topographic map of Antarctica. Scientific Committee on Antarctic Research (SCAR). Since 1993, regularly updated.

See also
 List of glaciers in the Antarctic
 List of Antarctic ice streams
 Glaciology

References

 

Glaciers of Ellsworth Land